WQAL (104.1 FM) is a commercial radio station licensed to Cleveland, Ohio, featuring a hot adult contemporary format known as "Q104" . Owned by Audacy, Inc., the station serves Greater Cleveland and surrounding Northeast Ohio. WQAL's studios are located at the Halle Building in Downtown Cleveland, while the station transmitter resides in the Cleveland suburb of North Royalton. In addition to a standard analog transmission, WQAL broadcasts over three HD Radio channels, and is available online via Audacy.

History
WJW was the flagship of a six-station Ohio network that carried the games in 1947 and 1948, a forerunner to the current Cleveland Indians Radio Network; however, the full games were often carried on WJW-FM, since the AM outlet did not have available air time due to its ABC network commitments. As a result, Cleveland became an FM hot bed, and more FM radio sets sold in Cleveland than in any other market in the country in 1948. WJW-FM would also originate programming for the Standard Network, a 14-station statewide service set up at the end of 1948 as an extension of the Indians Radio Network.

WJW-FM began carrying programming separate from their AM sister in 1966, featuring a mixture of concert and classical music. Storer Broadcasting would then change WJW-FM's callsign to WCJW; and debuted a country music format dubbed as "The Countrypolitan sound of Cleveland," both on January 15, 1968.

In early 1971, Storer sold off WCJW, along with WPNA in Philadelphia, to SJR Communications for a combined $1.4 million. With the change in ownership, SJR Communications changed WCJW's callsign to WQAL on May 12, 1971 after an unrelated FM station in Philadelphia gave it up; the WQAL calls also had an unrelated history on an early AM radio station in Mattoon, Illinois, which signed on in 1921 and shut down one year later. The meaning for the Cleveland call letters – "Quality Music" or "Quality Listening" – was carried over from the Philadelphia station. SJR merged most of their broadcasting assets, including WQAL, to Gulf United Broadcasting in 1981; Gulf would later spin off WQAL to WIN Communications, a locally-run company, in October 1984 for $4.8 million.

WQAL's format throughout the 1970s and 1980s was beautiful music as "Easy 104 WQAL" with some of Cleveland radio's best-known personalities, including "Tall" Ted Hallaman, James "Jay Lynn" Threatt, Ed Fisher, Al James, Frank Micale, and David Mark; Kevin Coan did news reports and co-hosted early mornings with Larry Morrow; Chris "Daniels" Eicher hosted middays, while Margo Johnson hosted evenings.

The station was the last remaining full-power signal in the Cleveland market to feature a beautiful music format after WDOK had dropped it for soft adult contemporary in 1987; WQAL would briefly adopt a similar format in 1990, first branded as "Soft Hits 104.1," and later "Great Hits 104.1". Industry veteran Dave Ervin was hired as WQAL's program director in late 1990, and changed the station's format in February 1991 to hot adult contemporary, branded as "Cleveland's Q104". Larry Morrow and Jay Lynn were retained in their respective morning drive and overnight timeslots, and were joined with: Sally Spitz, as Morrow's co-host; Johnny Williams for middays; Dan Deely for afternoon drive; and Jon Russell on evenings. Weekend hosts would also include Rick Allen (now at WONE-FM), Bill Ryan, Kelly Cannon, and Chuck Costanzo; the station also later became the Cleveland affiliate for American Top 20 and Rick Dees Weekly Top 40.

WIN Communications Inc. sold off WQAL to Chancellor Media in January 1999, joining WDOK, WJMO (1490 AM), WRMR (850 AM), WZAK and WZJM under the Chancellor umbrella via simultaneous buyouts for $275 million; it was, at the time, the largest radio station sale in Cleveland broadcasting history. On July 13, 1999, Chancellor Media merged with Capstar Broadcasting – which owned WKNR (1220 AM) – to form AMFM Inc., at that time the nation's largest radio-station owner with 465 stations. When AMFM, Inc. merged with Clear Channel Communications in August 2000, Clear Channel was forced to sell off WQAL along with the other Cleveland AMFM properties to comply with market ownership restrictions. WZJM, WDOK and WQAL were sold to Infinity Broadcasting, which later became CBS Radio.

WQAL moved to new studios at One Radio Lane, paired with WDOK, in December 2001. Current WQAL program director Dave Popovich held like duties at WDOK from 1999 to 2000 – and also worked at then-"Lite Rock 106½" WLTF, whose studios were at One Radio Lane in the late 1980s. In recent years, WQAL has been leaning more Top 40 in order to attract some of the younger 18- to 25-year-old audience.

On November 13, 2012, WQAL moved from its longtime studio home at One Radio Lane, off East Saint Clair Avenue in Downtown Cleveland, to the Halle Building on Euclid Avenue, also downtown. Sister station WDOK joined WQAL in the move; as a result, all four Cleveland CBS Radio stations are now located in the same building.

On February 2, 2017, CBS Radio announced it would merge with Entercom. The merger was approved on November 9, 2017, and was consummated on the 17th.

Current programming
WQAL personalities include Bill Ryan and Morgan Wright mornings, Chelsea Lyons middays, and Kelly McMann afternoons.

The HD2 digital subchannel airs a new CHR format under the brand "The New Music Channel". The HD2 channel plays new music releases and invites listeners to give feedback on the Q104 website on whether they would like to see the tracks added to the regular Q104 playlist. The HD3 channel carries Entercom's national Channel Q service.

References

External links

Cleveland Broadcast Radio Archives: WQAL timeline

1948 establishments in Ohio
Hot adult contemporary radio stations in the United States
Radio stations established in 1948
QAL
Audacy, Inc. radio stations
1948 in radio